Henri Bertrand may refer to:

 Henri Gatien Bertrand (1773–1844), French general
 Henri Bertrand (entomologist) (1892–1978), French entomologist
 Henri Bertrand (cyclist), Belgian cyclist